Boroxine is a 6-membered heterocyclic compound composed of alternating oxygen and singly-hydrogenated boron atoms. Boroxine derivatives (boronic anhydrides) such as trimethylboroxine and triphenylboroxine also make up a broader class of compounds called boroxines. These compounds are solids that are usually in equilibrium with their respective boronic acids at room temperature. Beside being used in theoretical studies, boroxine is primarily used in the production of optics.

Structure and bonding
Three-coordinate compounds of boron typically exhibit trigonal planar geometry, therefore the boroxine ring is locked in a planar geometry as well. These compounds are isoelectronic to benzene.  With the vacant p-orbital on the boron atoms, they may possess some aromatic character. Boron single-bonds on boroxine compounds are mostly s-character. Ethyl-substituted boroxine has B-O bond lengths of 1.384 Å and B-C bond lengths of 1.565 Å. Phenyl-substituted boroxine has similar bond lengths of 1.386 Å and 1.546 Å respectively, showing that the substituent has little effect on the boroxine ring size.

Substitutions onto a boroxine ring determine its crystal structure. Alkyl-substituted boroxines have the simplest crystal structure. These molecules stack on top of each other, aligning an oxygen atom from one molecule with a boron atom in another, leaving each boron atom between two other oxygen atoms. This forms a tube out of the individual boroxine rings. The intermolecular B-O distance of ethyl-substituted boroxine is 3.462 Å, which is much longer than the B-O bond distance of 1.384 Å. The crystal structure of phenyl-substituted boroxine is more complex. The interaction between the vacant p-orbitals in the boron atoms and the π-electrons in the aromatic, phenyl-substituents cause a different crystal structure. The boroxine ring of one molecule is stacked between two phenyl rings of other molecules. This arrangement allows the phenyl-substituents to donate π-electron density to the vacant boron p-orbitals.

Synthesis
As discovered in the 1930s, boroxines are produced from their corresponding boronic acids by dehydration. This dehydration can be done either by a drying agent or by heating under a high vacuum.  A more recent synthesis of trimethylboroxine involves the reaction of carbon monoxide with borane (B2H6) and lithium borohydride (LiBH4) as a catalyst:

Reactions
Trimethylboroxine is used in the methylation of various aryl halides through palladium-catalyzed Suzuki-Miyaura coupling reactions:

\overset{(X = Br, I)}{C6H5X} + (CH3BO)3 ->[\ce{K2CO3, Pd(PPh3)4}][\ce{dioxane}] C6H5CH3

Another form of the Suzuki-Miyaura coupling reaction exhibits selectivity to aryl chlorides:

Boroxines have also been examined as precursors to monomeric oxoborane, HB≡O. This compound quickly converts back to the cyclic boroxine, even at low temperatures.

References

Boron heterocycles
Inorganic compounds
Six-membered rings